Speedin' Bullet 2 Heaven is the fifth studio album by American musician Kid Cudi. The album was released on December 4, 2015, through Republic Records and Cudi's Wicked Awesome Records Imprint. The album is a complete departure from his previous projects, excluding WZRD, a 2012 collaborative effort which was his first venture into rock music. Inspired by the 1990s indie music scene, Cudi included commissioned skits featuring Mike Judge voicing the titular characters of his '90s animated sitcom, Beavis and Butt-Head.

Speedin' Bullet 2 Heaven, described by Cudi as alternative music, is the follow-up to his 2014 digital release, Satellite Flight: The Journey to Mother Moon. A double disc, the album includes 26 tracks in total; the album proper (Side A) contains 18, while Side B contains eight bonus tracks (mostly demos and outtakes). The album, primarily produced by Cudi himself, was supported by two official singles, "Confused!" and the title track "Speedin' Bullet 2 Heaven".

In support of the album Kid Cudi embarked on a national concert tour, which he called "The Especial Tour". The album received mixed reviews from critics and charted at number 36 on the US Billboard 200, becoming Cudi's lowest-charting album to date.

Background
After the unexpected release of his fourth album Satellite Flight: The Journey to Mother Moon (2014), which Kid Cudi called a prelude to the third installment in the Man on the Moon series and "the bridge between INDICUD and MOTM3", it was believed his following album would be the long-awaited Man on the Moon III. However, in a January 2015 interview, at the Sundance Film Festival, Cudi expressed the possibility of releasing another album before the release of Man on the Moon III: "I'm always making music. The beauty in that is that I have a lot of material. And I'm actually thinking that it would be good to release something in the meantime, before Man on the Moon III comes out. Another Kid Cudi album, it's just kind of along the lines of what I did with Indicud or Satellite Flight, which is just its own standalone thing but still a Kid Cudi album. The Man on the Moon III album is something that's gonna take some time but I know the fans are gonna be patient and I really appreciate that guys, thank you for your patience. But Man on the Moon III is coming, there may be an album before that just to tide you over." 

On April 4, 2015, Cudi announced via Twitter, that he would soon be releasing a new album titled Speedin' Bullet 2 Heaven, prior to Man on the Moon III. When speaking on the album in early July 2015, Cudi stated: "This album is 100% the purest form of my artistic self". He also added: "I've ripped my heart out and carved it into tiny pieces of musical madness". On August 6, 2015, Cudi dedicated the album to "everyone struggling with mental disorder all around the world." On September 29, 2015, Cudi announced that Speedin' Bullet 2 Heaven would be a double disc album, with the first disc containing the actual album while the second will be extras including, "previously unreleased jams, demos, rehearsal sessions, outtakes and more!!"

In 2020, Cudi said the album served as a "cry for help" as he reflected on it several years later: "Speedin' Bullet was a cry for help. I was literally screamin out to the world that I was hurting deeply and just wanted so badly to be understood."

Recording and production

On April 9, 2015, American drummer Travis Barker revealed he was in the studio with Kid Cudi and praised his upcoming album. On May 15, 2015, Cudi wrote on Twitter: "There's this one song Pat and I made a couple months ago in London that makes me cry every time I add lyrics to it. Inside my heart again", he later added "Haven't been this emotional making an album in a long time." On May 28, 2015, Kid Cudi revealed there would be "no features on Speedin' Bullet to Heaven." On July 4, 2015, via his Twitter account, Cudi confirmed that the album would not contain "synths or electronic sounds", but solely bass and guitar played by Cudi himself. He also revealed the album was "98% finished" and that he had produced every record himself, adding his former manager Plain Pat, was the only other person involved production wise. To clarify, Cudi also wrote: "Just to clear some things up! There will be drums on a majority of the album, as well as electric guitar." On August 3, 2015, Kid Cudi tweeted: "Nothing on SBTH was played with a click track. Nothing was snapped to grid. No quantization. Pure groove". On October 17, 2015, Cudi tweeted that he was "finalizing tracklisting(s) and mixes"; and later on October 21, he tweeted everything on the album was recorded using two-inch tape for improved sound quality.

Music and lyrics
Speedin' Bullet 2 Heaven is an alternative rock album. The album has been called "a cross between the Cudi of old and Nirvana with dark lyrics that touch on suicide and self worth." When commenting on the aspects of the album worth highlighting, critics commended "the occasional dark route that the lyrics take, exploring depression, suicide, and other personal flaws that are never easy to address through music." The music has also been said to "showcase CuDi's acoustic abilities backed by some dark lyrics." When speaking on the seventh track, Cudi said: "'The Nothing' is about addiction, the hauntings of it. Calling us."

Release and promotion
On March 3, 2015, Kid Cudi officially released his first song since his album Satellite Flight was put on the market. The song, which is titled "Love", was originally recorded for Satellite Flight and samples American alternative rock duo Ratatat's "Sunblocks". "Love" went on to receive positive reviews from fans and critics alike. On April 4, 2015, Cudi revealed he was working on an album titled Speedin' Bullet to Heaven, which he would soon be releasing. On April 25, 2015, Cudi assured fans this would not be a surprise release, unlike his last effort Satellite Flight, meaning this would be a formal album with marketing and promotion. On May 12, 2015, Cudi decided to preview a song titled "Edge of the Earth", from Speedin' Bullet 2 Heaven; he shared a low quality snippet of the new song, via his Twitter account, which he quickly deleted after.

On June 27, 2015, Kid Cudi revealed he would be releasing "massive info" on the album, in the upcoming week. On July 4, 2015, Cudi announced a single for the album would be released "before the end of the month." The single, titled "Confused!", was released on August 1, 2015. On August 7, 2015, Cudi released a song titled "JFKPSA", which features production and guitar from Cudi, as well as vocal samples of John F. Kennedy. On September 29, 2015, Cudi released the cover art for "Confused", which he designed himself. On October 2, 2015, Cudi released two new songs, "Wedding Tux" and "Judgmental Cunt". The songs were originally supposed to be released on iTunes, in a single pack, along with "Confused", however the iTunes release failed to materialize, forcing Cudi to release it via his official SoundCloud page.

On October 27, 2015, Kid Cudi announced the album's release date to be December 4. In November 2015 Cudi announced a Especial Tour, that will bring the rapper to various theaters all across the United States. The concert tour would kick off on November 30 in Denver at the Fillmore Auditorium and will snake back and forth across the United States hitting cities like Raleigh, Los Angeles, New York City, Chicago and ending on December 22, in Santa Ana at the Observatory.

On November 13, 2015, Kid Cudi revealed the track-listing to the album's first disc (Side A), via his Twitter. On November 17, 2015, Cudi unveiled the cover art for the album cover. On November 21, 2015, Cudi tweeted the album would first be released via digital distribution on December 4, while the physical copy of the album would be issued on December 18. Cudi explained: "The detailed package design I created requires some human assembly and takes a lil longer which is why the physicals come out 2 weeks later". The following day, the official track list and snippets of each track were released on a French website.

On December 1, 2015, Kid Cudi announced the cancellation of his Especial Tour, due to various reasons, such as production and personal issues. He wrote: "I got a lot I'm dealing with at this time in my personal life too and in order for the shows to be the best experience possible as well as keeping my sanity intact, I need to regroup. I have to." To make up for postponing the concert tour, Cudi released the album's title-track as the second single.

Speedin' Bullet 2 Heaven would later be released on cassette tapes, in a limited edition, with Cudi calling it "its true form."

Critical reception

Speedin' Bullet 2 Heaven received mixed to generally negative reviews from critics upon release. On Metacritic, which assigns a normalized rating out of 100, to reviews from mainstream publications, the album received an average score of 44, based on five reviews indicating "Mixed or average" reviews. Chris Mench of Complex, called the album "ultimately messy, challenging, and rough around the edges (perhaps more so than anything Scott has ever released), but there's also something about it that's admirably unique." Kris Ex of Billboard, who gave the album four out of five stars wrote "Speedin''' is an uncomfortably internal album that's a pleasurable listen. It's not as gleefully nihilistic as Future, but comes across just as revelatory. And it's more pointed than the fabricated faux-rebellion of Travi$ Scott." On the other hand, it received a cult following from many fans and high praises from a number of prominent artists, most notably André 3000, who called it "the best thing to come out in a long time." Kanye West, Erykah Badu and ASAP Rocky, also gave the album glowing endorsements.

Commercial performanceSpeedin' Bullet 2 Heaven debuted at number 36 on the US Billboard 200, for the chart dated December 26, 2015. The album sold 19,365 album equivalent copies, and 14,210 pure album copies.

Track listing
All songs written and produced by Kid Cudi, except where noted.

 Personnel 
Credits for Speedin' Bullet 2 Heaven'' adapted from AllMusic.

Sandy Brummels – creative art
Dennis Cummings – executive producer
Kid Cudi – art direction, bass, creative art, executive producer, guitars, vocals, producer
Iain Findlay – engineer, mixing
Anthony Kilhoffer – engineer, mixing
Kyledidthis – art direction
Gavin Lurssen – mastering
Oladipo Omishore – bass
Patrick Reynolds – producer

Charts

Weekly charts

Release history

References

External links
 

2015 albums
Beavis and Butt-Head
Kid Cudi albums
Republic Records albums
Alternative rock albums by American artists
Albums produced by Kid Cudi
Albums produced by Plain Pat
Wicked Awesome Records albums
Grunge albums